Casal Cermelli is a comune (municipality) in the Province of Alessandria in the Italian region Piedmont, located about  southeast of Turin and about  south of Alessandria.
 
Casal Cermelli borders the following municipalities: Bosco Marengo, Castellazzo Bormida, Frugarolo, and Predosa. Its hamlets (frazioni) are the villages of Fantanasse, Portanova, and Rossina.

References

 

Cities and towns in Piedmont